Sur les épaules de Darwin (in English "on the shoulders of Darwin") is a one-hour science radio program broadcast by France Inter in  France since 2010. it is also distributed globally as a podcast. It is presented and written by Jean-Claude Ameisen.

Bibliography 
 Jean Claude Ameisen, Sur les épaules de Darwin. Les battements du temps. France Inter/Les liens qui libèrent, 2012, 444p.
 Jean Claude Ameisen, Sur les épaules de Darwin. Je t'offrirai des spectacles admirables. France Inter/Les liens qui libèrent, 2013, 448p.
 Jean Claude Ameisen, Sur les épaules de Darwin : Retrouver l'aube. France Inter/Les liens qui libèrent, 2014, 448p.
 Jean Claude Ameisen, Nicolas Truong, Les chants mêlés de la Terre et de l’humanité. Editions de l'aube, 2015, 112p.

References

External links
 Website

Science education
Science podcasts
Science and technology in France
Science radio programmes
French radio programs
French podcasts